Sport Club Corinthians USA is a men's soccer club based in Fontana, CA that currently competes in the NPSL West Region's Southwest Conference. The team have the same name of a famous Brazilian team Sport Club Corinthians Paulista.

History

Founded in 2010 as a subsidiary of Brazilian club Sport Club Corinthians Paulista, the Sport Club Corinthians USA initially played in Coast Soccer League. The club ceased its partnership with the Brazilian club in 2013. In 2014, the team played the Lamar Hunt U.S. Open Cup. Since 2016 the team competes in NPSL.

References

2010 establishments in California
Association football clubs established in 2010
Soccer clubs in Greater Los Angeles
National Premier Soccer League teams
Sport Club Corinthians Paulista
Diaspora soccer clubs in the United States
Glendora, California